Pillku Urqu (Quechua pillku red, urqu mountain), also known as Pikul, Piqul (possibly a corruption of pillku, Hispanicized spellings Piccol, Picol, also Pikol, Piqol) or Wayna Piqul (Quechua wayna young, Hispanicized Huaynapicol, Huaynapiccol, also Wayna Piqol), is a  mountain in the Andes of Peru, near the city of Cusco. It is situated in the Cusco Region, Calca Province, Taray District, and in the Cusco Province, San Jerónimo District, north of San Jerónimo.

By the local people Pillku Urqu has been venerated as an apu.

See also 
 Anawarkhi
 Araway Qhata
 Mawk'ataray
 Pachatusan
 Pikchu
 Sinqa
 Wanakawri

References

Mountains of Peru
Mountains of Cusco Region